In mathematics, the affinely extended real number system is obtained from the real number system  by adding two infinity elements:  and  where the infinities are treated as actual numbers. It is useful in describing the algebra on infinities and the various limiting behaviors in calculus and mathematical analysis, especially in the theory of measure and integration.

When the meaning is clear from context, the symbol  is often written simply as 

Motivation

Limits
It is often useful to describe the behavior of a function  as either the argument  or the function value  gets "infinitely large" in some sense. For example, consider the function  defined by

The graph of this function has a horizontal asymptote at  Geometrically, when moving increasingly farther to the right along the -axis, the value of  approaches . This limiting behavior is similar to the limit of a function  in which the real number  approaches  except that there is no real number to which  approaches.

Measure and integration

In measure theory, it is often useful to allow sets that have infinite measure and integrals whose value may be infinite.

Such measures arise naturally out of calculus. For example, in assigning a measure to  that agrees with the usual length of intervals, this measure must be larger than any finite real number. Also, when considering improper integrals, such as

the value "infinity" arises. Finally, it is often useful to consider the limit of a sequence of functions, such as      

Without allowing functions to take on infinite values, such essential results as the monotone convergence theorem and the dominated convergence theorem would not make sense.

Order and topological properties

Moreover, with this topology,  is homeomorphic to the unit interval  Thus the topology is metrizable, corresponding (for a given homeomorphism) to the ordinary metric on this interval. There is no metric, however, that is an extension of the ordinary metric on 

In this topology, a set  is a neighborhood of  if and only if it contains a set  for some real number  The notion of the neighborhood of  can be defined similarly.

Arithmetic operations

For exponentiation, see . Here,  means both  and  while  means both  and 

These rules are modeled on the laws for infinite limits. However, in the context of probability or measure theory,  is often defined as 

However, in contexts where only non-negative values are considered, it is often convenient to define  For example, when working with power series, the radius of convergence of a power series with coefficients  is often defined as the reciprocal of the limit-supremum of the sequence .

Algebraic properties

With these definitions,  is not even a semigroup, let alone a group, a ring or a field as in the case of  However, it has several convenient properties:

In general, all laws of arithmetic are valid in —as long as all occurring expressions are defined.

Miscellaneous

For instance, one may define the extremal points of the following functions as:
  

Some singularities may additionally be removed.

As a result, a function may have limit  on the projectively extended real line, while in the affinely extended real number system only the absolute value of the function has a limit, e.g. in the case of the function  at  On the other hand, on the projectively extended real line,  and  correspond to only a limit from the right and one from the left, respectively, with the full limit only existing when the two are equal.

See also
 Division by zero
 Extended complex plane
 Extended natural numbers
 Improper integral
 Infinity
 Log semiring
 Series (mathematics)
 Projectively extended real line
 Computer representations of extended real numbers, see  and IEEE floating point

Notes

References

Further reading
 
 

Infinity
Real numbers